Metro is the trading name for bus company Citybus in Belfast, Northern Ireland. It is a subsidiary of the Northern Ireland Transport Holding Company, within the common management structure of Translink, along with Ulsterbus and Northern Ireland Railways.

History

Bus services began in Belfast under the Belfast Corporation Transport Department. For a time in the early 1950s, these buses ran alongside both the tram and trolleybus networks run by the Corporation until these networks were eventually abandoned, and like most mainland operators, Belfast Corporation ran a mixture of single deck and double-deck buses. The Northern Ireland Transport Holding Company acquired the operations of the Transport Department in 1970, and in 1973, the Transport Department was renamed to Belfast Citybus and was integrated with fellow NITHC company Ulsterbus, with both companies being managed by Werner Heubeck.

Citybus drivers and their buses were often caught in the crossfire of rioting and paramilitary action during The Troubles. Buses were often hijacked and used as burning barricades, and drivers were assaulted or robbed, while a total of 17 Ulsterbus and Citybus employees were killed over the course of The Troubles. 1,484 buses from both fleets were maliciously destroyed from 1964 to the signing of the Good Friday Agreement in 1998, with second-hand vehicles occasionally acquired from British operators.

Bus services in and around Belfast often ran in competition with black cab taxis throughout the 1970s and 1980s. These offered lower fares and provided individual services for Belfast's Protestant and Catholic communities at times when bus services were forced off the road by disorder and paramilitary action.

The Northern Ireland Transport Holding Company was rebranded to Translink in 1996. The Citybus name was initially retained through this rebranding process, however in 2004, it was announced that Citybus would be rebranded to 'Metro' in a network shake-up. The Metro network was launched on 7 February 2005. Buses were painted in a pink and white livery, in contrast to the blue and white livery of Ulsterbus, and the improved network of services was based on twelve quality bus corridors (QBCs) around Greater Belfast, promising a five to ten minute bus frequency. Over 540 complaints were made to Translink following the launch of Metro, largely due to buses arriving later than timetabled, however the launch was hailed as a success by Translink, citing a 6.3% increase in passenger numbers.

Services
Metro operates 12 quality bus corridors (QBCs) in Belfast and a number of additional routes. It also operates 5 bus stations situated in the city. On some routes the buses extend beyond Belfast into neighbouring towns, notably Newtownabbey and Dundonald, as well as outlying housing estates such as Poleglass, Twinbrook and Lagmore that used to fall within the Lisburn City Council but now falls under the Belfast City Council area.

Incidents
SFZ 9197 (fleet no. 2197), a Metro Wright Eclipse Gemini 3-bodied Volvo B5TL double-decker operating on route 11b was hijacked and set alight by sectarian rioters at the junction of Lanark Way and Shankill Road in the 2021 Northern Ireland riots. Rioters attempted to put the £250,000 bus into gear before releasing the handbrake and setting it alight. No passengers on board the bus were injured and the driver was left "unhurt but very badly shaken". Translink employees staged a protest at Belfast City Hall a day later against the rioting, threatening to withdraw bus services in East Belfast between 6pm and the morning.

SFZ 9195 (fleet no. 2195), another Metro Wright Eclipse Gemini 3-bodied Volvo B5TL double-decker similar to the unit hijacked in the 2021 Northern Ireland riots operating on route 2e was hijacked and set alight in Newtownabbey, County Antrim on 7 November. It follows another hijacking of an Ulsterbus double-decker a week prior in Newtownards. The hijackers claimed themselves to be from the Protestant Action Force, who have claimed the previous Newtownards attack to be part of a campaign against the Northern Ireland Protocol.

Fleet
As of 2021, Metro operates a fleet of 260 buses from four depots, predominantly bodied by Wrightbus of Ballymena. The fleet is augmented by 30 Van Hool ExquiCity 18 articulated buses for the Glider network and the first three hydrogen buses in Northern Ireland, which entered service in Belfast in December 2020. They are part of a larger order for 100 zero emissions buses to be built for Translink by Wrightbus in 2021–2022.

Like Ulsterbus, the former Citybus standardised on  Alexander-bodied Bristol REs, Leyland Leopards, Leyland Tigers and Volvo B10Ms before the advent of low-floor buses, many of which were maliciously destroyed in sectarian violence. No further double-decker buses were purchased following Citybus' integration into the NITHC, with high maintenance costs being cited for the move to single deckers. However in 2001, double decker buses were reintroduced to Belfast through the purchase of 20 low-floor Volvo B7TLs with Alexander ALX400 bodywork for both Citybus and Ulsterbus.

See also
List of bus operators of the United Kingdom
Ulsterbus
Belfast Rapid Transport

References

External links

Translink - Metro website

Transport in Belfast
Bus operators in Northern Ireland
Government-owned companies of Northern Ireland